Margherita Pignatelli Aragona Cortés, duchess d'Andria (1740–1810) was an Italian courtier.

Life
She was born to Prince Fabrizio di Noia and Costanza de' Medici, and married Duke Riccardo Carafa d'Andria in 1767. She served as principal lady-in-waiting (Mistress of the Robes) to Queen Maria Carolina of Austria. She was the mother of Ettore Carafa, who had Republican sympathies. His political views were a cause of conflict between them, as the queen had her reprimand him for his views. When the Parthenopean Republic was declared in 1799, however, she became one of its profiled supporters, and became known for her efforts to help the wounded. At the fall of the republic, she was arrested by a Royalist mob and reportedly undressed in a mock attempt by the mob to portray her as the goddess of liberty. She managed to avoid a death sentence for her support of the Republic.

References
 Naples in 1799 : an account of the revolution of 1799 and of the rise and fall of the Parthenopean republic"
 Cinzia Recca: Sentimenti e politica. Il diario inedito della regina Maria Carolina, 2014

Italian ladies-in-waiting
1740 births
1810 deaths
Italian duchesses
18th-century Italian people
People of the Parthenopean Republic
18th-century Neapolitan people
18th-century Italian women
19th-century Italian women